Ann Mara (June 18, 1929 – February 1, 2015) was an American businesswoman, socialite, philanthropist, the wife  and later widow of Wellington Mara, and the matriarch of the Mara family, which includes New York Giants CEO John Mara, and her granddaughters, actresses Rooney Mara and Kate Mara.

Personal life
Mara was born Ann Maria Teresa Mumm in Manhattan, New York City, the daughter of Olive (née DuBord) and George Mumm. She was of German, French-Canadian, and Irish ancestry. She married Wellington Mara (1916–2005) in 1954 and had eleven children.

Ann Mumm met Wellington Mara by chance when a woman fainted at a 7:30 a.m. Mass that they both regularly attended. Both Ann and Wellington rushed to her side to help. Three of their early dates took place at Yankee Stadium, Madison Square Garden, and the Fordham gymnasium. After that Ann and Wellington were married, in 1954. They took their honeymoon in Southern California. Ann and Wellington had 11 children (7 girls and 4 boys) and 42 grandchildren. All their girls attended Convent of the Sacred Heart.

Her husband is considered  to have been one of the most influential figures in the history of the National Football League as the owner of the New York Giants. Ann Mara had been called the "First Lady of Football". As a philanthropist, she donated money to various causes. In November 2014 she dedicated the opening of a new building for the San Miguel Academy for children at risk, which was built through the NFL Snowflake Foundation.

Media attention
Mara was an active member of the Giants community. In 2012 she gained media attention after having an argument with Terry Bradshaw.

Death
Mara was in good health until she fell on ice when she was fetching her newspaper outside of her Harrison home. Mara's housekeeper usually went to get the paper but on that day Mara went to get it herself. She died from pneumonia two weeks after her fall, on February 1, 2015. She was 85 years old. She was remembered with a moment of silence during Super Bowl XLIX; also, the Giants wore a patch on the right side of their uniforms, near the shoulders during the following season in her memory, with the letters "ATM" in black on a white circle background.

References

1929 births
2015 deaths
American socialites
Philanthropists from New York (state)
Mara family
American people of Irish descent
Accidental deaths from falls
Accidental deaths in New York (state)
People from Manhattan
American people of German descent
American people of French-Canadian descent
New York Giants
Catholics from New York (state)
20th-century American philanthropists
Burials at Gate of Heaven Cemetery (Hawthorne, New York)